George William Francis (1800–9 August 1865) was an English horticulturalist and science writer. He migrated to the colony of South Australia in 1849 and became the first director of the Adelaide Botanic Garden in 1860.

Life
Born in London, Francis emigrated to Australia for improved prospects of supporting his family; he arrived in the Louisa Baillie  on 2 September 1849. Shortly he took over the old botanical garden of Adelaide, north of the Torrens River, as a tenant. He was then appointed director of the Adelaide Botanic Garden, a position he held for the rest of his life.

Francis died of dropsy on 9 August 1865 and was buried the next day, leaving a widow and ten children.

Legacy
Francis established much of the garden and pagoda in the first botanical museum in Adelaide, the Adelaide Botanic Garden.

Works
Francis published:

 Catalogue of British Plants and Ferns, 1835; 5th edition, 1840. 
 Analysis of British Ferns, 1837; 5th edition, 1855. 
 Little English Flora, 1839.
 Grammar of Botany, 1840. 
 Chemical Experiments, 1842, abridged by W. White, 1851, and republished as Chemistry for Students.
 Favourites of the Flower Garden, 1844. 
 Manual of Practical Levelling for Railways and Canals, 1846.
 Art of Modelling Wax Flowers, 1849. 
 Electrical Experiments, 8th edition, 1855. 
 Dict. Practical Receipts, new edition, 1857. 
 Acclimatisation of Animals and Plants, Royal Society, South Australia, 1862.

Francis also edited the first five volumes of the Magazine of Science and School of Arts, 1840–5.

Notes

Further reading

Council of Heads of Australasian Herbaria Australian National Herbarium Biography, Francis, George William (1800-1865).

Attribution

External links
 

1800 births
1865 deaths
19th-century British botanists
19th-century Australian botanists
English writers
Australian writers